The Comedy Store is an American comedy club opened in April 1972. It is located in West Hollywood, California, at 8433 Sunset Boulevard on the Sunset Strip. An associated club is located in La Jolla, San Diego, California.

History
The Comedy Store was opened in April 1972 by comedians Sammy Shore (1927–2019), and Rudy De Luca. The building was formerly the home of Club Seville (1935), later, Ciro's (1940–1957), a popular Hollywood nightclub owned by William Wilkerson, and later Ciro's Le Disc, a rock and roll venue, where The Byrds were discovered in 1964.

When the venue reopened as The Comedy Store in 1972, it included a 99-seat theatre. As a result of a divorce settlement, Sammy Shore's ex-wife Mitzi Shore began operating the club in 1973, and she was able to buy the building in 1976. She immediately renovated and expanded the club to include a 450-seat main room.

In 1974, The Comedy Store hosted the wedding reception of newlyweds Liza Minnelli and Jack Haley, Jr. The Comedy Club signage was covered, for the evening, by signs reading "Ciro's", denoting the venue's prior identity.  The event was attended by many dozens of Hollywood glitterati, including Elizabeth Taylor, Sammy Davis Jr., Cher, Bob Fosse, Johnny Carson, Goldie Hawn, Cesar Romero, Priscilla Presley and other stars, past and present.

Locations
The original Comedy Store on Sunset at Ciro's had been joined by the Comedy Store Westwood, at 1621 Westwood Blvd., the Comedy Store La Jolla, at 916 Pearl St., Comedy Store Playhouse, on Las Palmas, Comedy Store at the Sheraton Universal Hotel, in Universal City, and the Comedy Store Las Vegas at the Dunes Hotel.

Job action
Beginning in 1979, The Comedy Store served for many years as the host location for the annual HBO Young Comedians specials.

Tension between the club owners stems from a 1979 strike of Los Angeles comedians against the Comedy Store’s “no-pay policy.” Until that time, neither Shore nor Friedman paid comedians a salary. The theory was that comedians should almost be paying the owners for the exposure the clubs provided. When the comedians’ strike began, The Improv (opened in 1974 at 8162 Melrose Avenue) was closed for fire-damage repairs. Therefore, the strike focused on Shore, not Friedman.

Also in 1979, stand-up comedians formed a short-lived labor union and demanded to be paid for their appearances at The Comedy Store. For six weeks (beginning in March), several famous comedians staged a protest in front of the club, while others crossed the picket line. The comedians involved formed a union called Comedians for Compensation and fought for pay where they had received none before. They eventually picketed in front of the club when their demands were not met. Jay Leno and David Letterman were among those on the picket line while Garry Shandling and Yakov Smirnoff crossed the line.

The job action was not legally a strike as the comedians were classified as "independent contractors" and were not under contract with the club.

Mitzi Shore argued that the club was and had always been a showcase and training ground for young comedians and was not about profits. She alleged that comedians came to the club and could work on their material in front of casting agents and other talent scouts who would possibly hire them as professionals if they were good enough.

The comedians at the club became unhappy when the club was expanded several times and it was perceived that Shore's profits were quite substantial. Shore also paid the rest of her staff, including waitresses and bartenders.

After the strike, some comedians were no longer allowed to perform at the club, including Steve Lubetkin, who committed suicide by jumping off the roof of the Continental Hyatt House next door. His suicide note included the line: "My name is Steve Lubetkin. I used to work at The Comedy Store." Lubetkin hoped that his suicide would resolve the labor dispute. He also cited Shore as the reason he no longer had a job.

The union ceased to exist in 1980, although from the time of the job action onward, comedians in Los Angeles were paid for their shows. This included The Comedy Store and The Improv.

Cresthill house 
Mitzi Shore also owned a 5,000-square-foot house a few doors away from the club, on 8420 Cresthill Road. The house was bought with the club in 1976. In 1979, she started to let the comedians from the clubs crash there. During the 1980s, numerous famous comedians resided or just partied there, including Dice, Kinison, Carrey, Maron, Robin Williams, Richard Pryor, Yakov Smirnoff, and Bill Hicks. Argus Hamilton and Mike Binder were the first to officially move in the house. Dave Coulier was also an early resident, and Yakov Smirnoff moved in in 1980. The place was famous for its all-night parties and heavy consumption of cocaine and alcohol. Bill Hicks moved there in 1980 when he was 18 and running away from his parents to pursue his career as a comedian. Many of those comedians developed their style while residing there. Sam Kinison was a pillar there, and Jim Carrey turned his act around in this house. Mitzi Shore had a plan to cash in on the house's unique atmosphere, and even shot a 12-minute pilot around 1987 starring Daphne Davis, Nancy Redman, and Tamayo Otsuki. In 1988, because of the debauchery that had been going on for years, Mitzi Shore kicked everybody out of the house and turned it into a recovery house. By the early 1990s, Her son Pauly moved in the house, and by the end of the 1990s, the house was sold.

Notable alumni 

 — "A history of the young comedians coming to Los Angeles in the 1970s and performing at the club."

Tim Allen
Louie Anderson
Roseanne Barr
Don Barris
Sandra Bernhard
Mike Binder
Elayne Boosler
David Brenner
Bill Burr
Bryan Callen
John Caparulo
George Carlin
Jim Carrey
Dana Carvey
Dave Chappelle
Chevy Chase
Cheech & Chong
Louis C.K.
Whitney Cummings
Andrew Dice Clay
Jenn Colella
Billy Crystal
Rodney Dangerfield
Chris D'Elia
Joey Diaz
Tom Dreesen
Gallagher
Jeff Garlin
Whoopi Goldberg
Gilbert Gottfried
Kathy Griffin
Argus Hamilton
Chelsea Handler
Kevin Hart
Bill Hicks
Charlie Hill
Tony Hinchcliffe
Joel Hodgson
Andy Kaufman
Michael Keaton
Sam Kinison
Bill Kirchenbauer
Bert Kreischer
Martin Lawrence
Bobby Lee
Jay Leno
Annie Lederman
David Letterman
Jay London
Norm Macdonald
Kathleen Madigan
Sebastian Maniscalco
Howie Mandel
Marc Maron
Carlos Mencia
Dennis Miller
Paul Mooney
Eddie Murphy
Christina Pazsitzky
Esther Povitsky
Pat Proft
Ollie Joe Prater
Richard Pryor
Chris Rock
Paul Rodriguez
Joe Rogan
Ray Romano
Chris Rush
Bob Saget
Andrew Santino
Tom Segura
Jerry Seinfeld
Ari Shaffir
Garry Shandling
Iliza Shlesinger
Pauly Shore
Sarah Silverman
Yakov Smirnoff
Phil Snyder
Freddy Soto
David Spade
Brody Stevens
Duncan Trussell
Theo Von
Jimmie Walker
Marsha Warfield
Jeff Wayne
Marc Weiner
Robin Williams
Thomas F. Wilson
John Witherspoon
David Zed

Docu-series
A docu-series based on The Comedy Store debuted on Showtime in October 2020.

Each episode is an hour long and breaks down a different time period throughout the existence of the Comedy Store. The director, Mike Binder goes on a podcast with a different comedian to set the tone and help provide the narrative of each episode.

Episodes

References

External links
	
 

Comedy Store, The
Comedy Store, The
Comedy Store, The
West Hollywood, California
1972 establishments in California